The 1983–84 All-Ireland Senior Club Football Championship was the 14th staging of the All-Ireland Senior Club Football Championship since its establishment by the Gaelic Athletic Association in 1970-71.

Portlaoise were the defending champions, however, they failed to qualify after being beaten in the Laois County Championship.

On 12 February 1984, Nemo Rangers won the championship following a 2-10 to 0-05 defeat of Walterstown in the All-Ireland final at Páirc Chiaráin. This was their fourth championship title overall and their first title since 1982.

Results

Munster Senior Club Football Championship

First round

Semi-finals

Final

All-Ireland Senior Club Football Championship

Quarter-final

Semi-finals

Final

Championship statistics

Miscellaneous

 St. Mary's became the first team to win three Connacht Club Championship titles.

References

1983 in Gaelic football
1984 in Gaelic football